Royal Lake of the Woods Yacht Club is a yacht club in Ontario, Canada. It is located on Yacht Club Island approximately 2 miles from Kenora, Ontario, on Lake of the Woods. The yacht club was founded in 1903.

History
The first record of sailing on Lake of the Woods dates back to 1845, when the Hudson's Bay Company introduced York boats dawned with sails in order to transport their furs. The first camps were built on Keewatin Beach. For round twenty years, canoeing, rowing and sailing were the only means of transportation. The first motorboats were introduced in the late 1890s.

Keewatin Beach campers participated in sailing, rowing, and gymkhana events. By 1898, cruising races were run on McMillan Island. One of the earliest forms of these cruises was via the Keewatin Channel to Galt Island where the G.F Galt family hosted a picnic lunch. In 1903, sailboats became popular and motorized boats were introduced. A building was subsequently developed on McMillan Island and became the first clubhouse. George William Northwood designed the club house for Lake of the Woods Yacht Club in 1909 

The first officers of the yacht club were: Commodore G.W. Baker, Vice Commodore W.E. Macara, Captain Fred Phillips, Measurer H.F. Forrest and Treasurer R.H. Mulock.

Royal Assent
In 1914, Prince Arthur and his daughter Princess Patricia visited the club. They suggested that it apply for the title of "Royal". The privilege was delayed because of World War I, but was later granted in 1925 with The Royal Lake of the Woods Yacht Club Incorporation Act. Commodore G.F. Galt was notified that King George V had granted the use of Royal to the Lake of the Woods Yacht Club.

Further reading
In 1979, Robert Whitla Richards wrote 'Royal Lake of the Woods Yacht Club : history to 1978' to commemorate RLWYC's 75th anniversary 1903-1978.

CJ Conway and Lori Nelson wrote "Royal Lake of the Woods Yacht Club: A Century of Summers" to commemorate RLWYC's 100th Anniversary 1903-2003.

Notable Members
Gordon Chown
John Turner
The Richardson family
Ashleigh Banfield

References

External links 
 Royal Lake of the Woods Yacht Club

Royal yacht clubs
Yacht clubs in Canada
Organizations based in Ontario
1903 establishments in Ontario
Buildings and structures completed in 1909
Lake of the Woods